The office of King's Counsel was established in New Zealand in 1907. During the reign of a male sovereign, appointees are called King's Counsel, and this applied from 1907 to 1952 during the reign of Edward VII (1907–1910), George V (1910–1936), Edward VIII (1936), and George VI (1936–1952). During Elizabeth II's reign (February 1952 – September 2022), new appointees were called Queen's Counsel and living King's Counsel became Queen's Counsel. Forty-three King's Counsel had been appointed before 1952. When King Charles III ascended the throne on 9 September 2022 (New Zealand Time), living Queen's Counsel became King's Counsel.

Appointments in New Zealand can be made annually by the Governor-General acting on behalf of the sovereign. Recommendations are made by the Attorney-General with concurrence by the Chief Justice. When the first ten appointments were made in June 1907 by Chief Justice Robert Stout, two were from Auckland, four were from Wellington, two were from Christchurch, and two were from Dunedin. The first King's Counsel to die was Thomas Joynt on 5 September 1907, less than three months after his appointment; Joynt had been the senior member of the bar in the country. The next round of appointments is expected in October 2022.

Of the 108 years since 1907 (as of 2015), there have been 40 years in which no appointments were made. There have been 282 warrant holders so far.

The first women appointed to the office were Sian Elias and Lowell Goddard in 1988.

List of office holders

The following is a complete list of the office holders, based on the list maintained by the Crown Law Office plus one person (Claude Weston) who, according to the Law Society, is missing on the official list. Another person who is missing from the official list is Justice Warwick Gendall, who took silk in June 1996 and was appointed to the High Court later that year.

References

Lists of office-holders in New Zealand
 
1907 establishments in New Zealand